Schloendorff v. Society of New York Hospital, 105 N.E. 92 (N.Y. 1914), was a decision issued by the New York Court of Appeals in 1914 which established principles of respondeat superior in United States law.

Facts
In January 1908, Mary Schloendorff, also known as Mary Gamble—an elocutionist from San Francisco—was admitted to New York Hospital to evaluate and treat a stomach disorder. Some weeks into her stay at the hospital, the house physician diagnosed a fibroid tumor. The visiting physician recommended surgery, which Schloendorff adamantly declined. She consented to an examination under ether anesthesia. During the procedure, the doctors performed surgery to remove the tumor. Afterwards, Schloendorff developed gangrene in the left arm, ultimately leading to the amputation of some fingers. Schloendorff blamed the surgery, and filed suit.

Judgment
The Court found that the operation to which the plaintiff did not consent constituted medical battery. Justice Benjamin Cardozo wrote in the Court's opinion:

Schloendorff, however, had sued the hospital itself, not the physicians. For this reason, the Court found that a non-profit hospital could not be held liable for the actions of its employees, analogizing to the principle of charitable immunity.

Significance
The idea that a non-profit hospital could not be sued for actions of its employees became a principle that became known as the "Schloendorff rule."  The Court would later reject the "Schloendorff rule" in the 1957 decision of Bing v. Thunig.

See also
US tort law

References

External links
 
 
 Summary and Opinion of the case

New York (state) state case law
United States tort case law
1914 in United States case law
1914 in New York (state)
Medical lawsuits
Medical malpractice
Consent